Hyllisia stenideoides is a species of beetle in the family Cerambycidae. It was described by Pascoe in 1864.

References

stenideoides
Beetles described in 1864
Taxa named by Francis Polkinghorne Pascoe